The 2018 FIA Formula 3 European Championship was the seventh and final season of the FIA Formula 3 European Championship, a multi-event motor racing championship for third-tier single-seat open wheel formula racing cars that is held across Europe. The championship features drivers competing in two-litre Formula 3 racing cars which conform to the technical regulations, or formula, for the championship. Teams and drivers competed in ten rounds, running in support of a variety of European motorsport championships including the Deutsche Tourenwagen Masters, Blancpain GT Series Endurance Cup and the FIA World Endurance Championship.

As the FIA Formula 3 European Championship and GP3 Series are planned to merge and form the FIA Formula 3 Championship in 2019, 2018 was the final year that the championship was run since its formation in 2012.

Mick Schumacher won the championship on his second season. He took the championship lead after win in the first Spielberg race and held it until the second Hockenheim race, where he clinched the title.  Dan Ticktum was the championship leader after first Hungaroring race and from finish of the first Silverstone race till the finish of the first Spielberg race but he scored only 42 out of 150 possible points in the final two rounds, losing the title battle by 59 points. Robert Shwartzman won the rookies' championship and completed the top-three in the driver's standings ahead of another Ferrari Driver Academy members Marcus Armstrong and Guanyu Zhou. Armstrong was placed behind Jüri Vips in both Drivers' and Rookies' standings. While fellow Estonian driver Ralf Aron was behind Armstrong in the driver standings. Prema Theodore Racing successfully defended the teams' championship title, winning over Motopark with one round to spare, and maintaining their record of being the only team to have won the teams' championship since the FIA Formula 3 European Championship was launched in 2012.

Champion Mick Schumacher took 8 wins - one each in Belgium, Italy, Great Britain. He took a hat-trick at the Nürburgring and he won two races at the Red Bull Ring.  Runner-up Dan Ticktum, Jüri Vips and Ralf Aron - all took 4 race wins. Guanyu Zhou, Enaam Ahmed and Robert Shwartzman won two races. Marcus Armstrong, Sacha Fenestraz, Jehan Daruvala and Nikita Troitskiy were all victorious once respectively.

Entries
The following teams and drivers are currently competing in the 2018 championship:

Team changes
ma-con and Fortec Motorsports, which have previously competed until the 2013 and 2015 seasons made their comeback to the championship after a four-year and two-year hiatus respectively.

Driver changes
Italian F4 champion Marcus Armstrong made his Formula 3 debut with Prema Powerteam. He is partnered by Robert Shwartzman, who finished third in the 2017 Eurocup Formula Renault 2.0. Callum Ilott, who raced for the team in 2017, moved to the GP3 Series. After a season with Hitech GP, Ralf Aron returned to Prema. Maximilian Günther, who finished third in 2017, stepped up to FIA Formula 2 Championship, leaving his Prema seat vacant.
Fabio Scherer and Jonathan Aberdein, who finished fifth and ninth respectively in the 2017 ADAC Formula 4 Championship, moved up to the series with Motopark. They are joined by 2017 Italian F4 Championship driver Sebastián Fernández, 2017 Macau Grand Prix winner Dan Ticktum and 2017 ADAC Formula 4 champion Jüri Vips. David Beckmann, who raced with the team switched to GP3 Series. Joel Eriksson received 2018 Deutsche Tourenwagen Masters drive with BMW, leaving his Motopark seat vacant.
After competing in the selected rounds of the 2017 championship, Devlin DeFrancesco and Ameya Vaidyanathan made their full-time switch to European F3 with Carlin from Euroformula Open. 2017 Eurocup Formula Renault 2.0 champion Sacha Fenestraz, who have competed Nürburgring round for Carlin in 2017 also made the full-time switch. They are joined by 2017 Euroformula Open Championship runner-up Nikita Troitskiy. Reigning champion Lando Norris graduated to the FIA Formula 2 Championship, leaving his Carlin seat vacant.
Keyvan Andres switched from Motopark to Van Amersfoort Racing. He is joined by Italian F4 Championship graduate Artem Petrov.  Harrison Newey left the team and the championship, moving to sports car racing with Rebellion Racing in the 2018 European Le Mans Series. Joey Mawson and Pedro Piquet left the team and the championship to join Arden International and Trident respectively in the GP3 Series.
Julian Hanses, who finished eleventh in the 2017 ADAC Formula 4 Championship is scheduled to graduate with series returnees ma-con, after missing three rounds he returned with Carlin at Spielberg.
BRDC British Formula 3 champion Enaam Ahmed and his rival Ben Hingeley moved to European Formula 3, joining Hitech GP. They are joined by Álex Palou, who finished third in the 2017 All-Japan Formula Three Championship. Nikita Mazepin left Hitech after two consecutive seasons to join ART Grand Prix in the GP3 Series. Tadasuke Makino also left the team to join the FIA Formula 2 Championship.
Midseason changes
 Petru Florescu, who raced with Motopark in 2017, returned to the championship with Fortec Motorsports.
 Sophia Flörsch stepped up from ADAC Formula 4, joining Van Amersfoort Racing from round 4 onwards.
 China Formula 4 champion Charles Leong made his FIA F3 European Championship debut at Silverstone with Hitech Bullfrog GP.

Calendar
The following ten rounds are being contested as part of the 2018 championship:

Calendar changes
The round at the Autodromo Nazionale Monza was replaced by a new round at Misano World Circuit Marco Simoncelli as the series continues to support the Deutsche Tourenwagen Masters. The Pau Grand Prix replaced Monza as the opening round of the championship, with the Silverstone round held later in the season.

Results and standings

Season summary

Scoring system
Points are awarded to the top ten drivers. Guest drivers are not eligible to score points.

In order for the full points score to be awarded, the race must run for at least twenty-five minutes. In the event that less than twenty-five minutes elapse, half points are awarded.

Drivers' championship

Notes:
† — Drivers did not finish the race, but were classified as they completed over 90% of the race distance.

Rookies' championship

Notes:
† — Drivers did not finish the race, but were classified as they completed over 90% of the race distance.

Teams' championship
Points for the team classification solely are awarded to two best finishing cars of each team, omitting the other cars from the classification of the race.

Footnotes

References

External links

FIA Formula 3 European Championship
European Championship
FIA Formula 3 European Championship
Formula 3